Henpecked Hoboes is a theatrical cartoon short released on October 26, 1946 directed by Tex Avery. It stars George and Junior in their first appearance. According to model sheets, the cartoon's working title was Bums Away.

Plot

George and Junior are hobos who want a chicken dinner. George's plans for catching a hen are constantly sabotaged by Junior's detrimental assistance. The duo take on more than they can chew as they attempt to get their hands on an alluring hen. George dons a rooster suit to lure away the hen from her guardian rooster, who is sent rocketing to the North Pole.

While the rooster walks back to civilization, George and Junior wreak havoc upon each other. They dress up as a worm (that is eaten by the hen) and a giant chick who is mothered to near-death. All in an attempt to get the alluring female onto the dinner table. At the end George, after one too many screwups, kicks Junior in the rear hard into the air. The hen then delivers a hard kick of her own to George, sending him flying.

Satisfied, the hen wipes her hands. She then feels a hand tap on her shoulder, and turns around. She is shocked to find that the rooster has returned. He is not happy about his trek back home, and motions for her to bend over. He gets his revenge by delivering countless kicks to the hen's backside, all the way back to the barn.

References

External links 
 

1946 animated films
1946 short films
1946 films
1940s American animated films
1940s animated short films
Metro-Goldwyn-Mayer animated short films
Films directed by Tex Avery
Fictional hoboes
Films with screenplays by Henry Wilson Allen
Films scored by Scott Bradley
Animated films about chickens
Films about homelessness
Films produced by Fred Quimby
Metro-Goldwyn-Mayer cartoon studio short films